Dave Brubeck in Berlin is a 1965 live album by Dave Brubeck recorded at the Berliner Philharmonie in Berlin. The album was only released on LP in Germany, after having been recorded for radio broadcast by WDR Cologne. It was not released in the United States until 1999.

Reception

The album was reviewed by Ken Dryden at Allmusic who wrote that "[Paul] Desmond is witty as usual in "St. Louis Blues," though Brubeck adds an amusing Charlie Parker lick in his solo and bassist Eugene Wright also shines." Dryden wrote that Brubeck's "economical solo" on "Koto Song" "...contrasts with his supposed reputation for heavy-handed playing. The group's breezy rendition of "Take the 'A' Train" is followed by the inevitable "Take Five"."

Track listing
 "St. Louis Blues" (W. C. Handy) - 12:05
 "Koto Song" (Dave Brubeck) - 7:44
 "Take the "A" Train" (Billy Strayhorn) - 8:30
 "Take Five" (Paul Desmond) - 6:30

Personnel
Dave Brubeck - piano
Paul Desmond - alto saxophone
Gene Wright - double bass
Joe Morello - drums
Teo Macero - producer

References

1965 live albums
Albums produced by Teo Macero
CBS Records live albums
Dave Brubeck live albums